Sulumbek Gandaloev (1878 – 25 August 1911), and better known as Salambek Gorovadzhiev or Sulumbek of Sagopshi, was an Ingush abrek who was known for making raids on Russian banks together with his colleague and comrade Zelimkhan. Sulumbek participated in the most high-profile events associated with Zelimkhan. National hero of Ingush people.

Biography 

Born in 1878 in the village of Sagopshi, Vladikavkaz district of the Terek region. Ingush by nationality. Due to a conflict with a Cossack officer, the future abrek ended up in prison.

In prison, Sulumbek met Zelimkhan Gushmazukaev (the future Chechen abrek). Archival documents testify that Zelimkhan and Sulumbek escaped from prison together. Then they became friends, took part in raids together. Sulumbek at the same time chose the most dangerous area. He repeatedly participated in daring raids together with Zelimkhan: in the robbery of the Kizlyar Bank, the attack on the rich, cash desks and mail, Sulumbek's head was estimated by the tsarist authorities at 10 thousand rubles.

Sulumbek repeatedly rescued Zelimkhan in dangerous situations where the Chechen abrek could die. In a skirmish with the Benoites, many abreks were killed. A Benoev named Butsus crushed Zelimkhan under him, a weakened and defeated abrek could not fight off the onslaught of a Benoev. Zelimkhan, who was losing strength, asked the wounded Sulumbek to help him, and Sulumbek was able to kill Butsus with one shot. Zelimkhan took the wounded Sulumbek with him.

Death 
After the devastation of the Ingush villages of Kek, Nelkh and Ersh and the repressions against their inhabitants for harboring Zelimkhan, the authorities also demanded the inhabitants of the village of Sagopshi to extradite Sulumbek. Despite the persuasion of Zelimkhan and fellow villagers, Sulumbek, not wanting to endanger people, decided to surrender to the authorities, on the condition that he would be shot and not hanged. He was detained on October 21, 1910, and the authorities did not keep their promise to him. Sulumbek was executed by hanging on August 9, 1911. Eyewitnesses of the execution testified that until the very end he retained a rare outward calmness and self-control and that he himself kicked out the chair on which he stood.

Folksongs about Sulumbek 
The Vainakhs have a tradition of composing heroic songs - "illi", dedicated to one or another glorious people of their past.
For example, in one of the Ingush heroic illis, Salambek is sung about, like others, sings of the exploits of the Ingush abrek, but at the same time expresses hidden regret that the Ingush still do not have effective laws that make it possible to really judge the deeds of this or that person:

References

Bibliography 
 
 
 

History of Ingushetia
Ingush people
History of the Caucasus
1878 births
1911 deaths
People from the Russian Empire